Union Township is an inactive township in Washington County, in the U.S. state of Missouri.

Union Township was erected in 1852.

References

Townships in Missouri
Townships in Washington County, Missouri